No Silence is the fifth studio album released by German DJ and producer, ATB. It was released in 2004 and includes hits such as "Marrakech", "Ecstasy" and "Here with Me" (all featuring vocals by Tiff Lacey). These three songs were released as singles, with promotional videos for the first two. The first two singles were released from the album No Silence, while "Here With Me" was released from The DJ 2 in the Mix, ATB's second DJ mix compilation. The song "Marrakech" was used in the Mindhunters film. There is also a special edition album version, which includes a bonus DVD with remixes and videos. Unlike his other album releases, ATB used a cross fade effect on each song as a transition to the next song on the album with dream-like sequences and sounds of nature.

Track listing

Charts

References

ATB albums
2004 albums